Shaa may refer to:

People 

Edmund Shaa, goldsmith, Sheriff and Lord Mayor of London
John Shaa, goldsmith, nephew of Edmund, joint Master of the Mint, Sheriff and Lord Mayor of London
Ralph Shaa, 15th-century English theologian
Shaa Wasmund, a British businesswoman
Shaa, original illustrator of Nogizaka Haruka no Himitsu

See also 
Shah (disambiguation)
Sha (disambiguation)